WFCA (107.9 FM), known as "FM108", is a Southern Gospel music radio station based in French Camp, Mississippi, United States. WFCA serves Central Mississippi with an ERP of 100,000 Watts.

The non-profit station, owned by French Camp Academy, is located along mile marker 181 of the Natchez Trace Parkway in French Camp.

Cities in WFCA's primary coverage area include Starkville, Winona, Louisville, Kosciusko, and Greenwood, Mississippi. WFCA's signal can be heard as far north as Tupelo, Mississippi, as far south as Jackson, Mississippi, as far west as Greenville, Mississippi, and as far east as Aliceville, Alabama.

History
H. Richard Cannon, president of French Camp Academy, conceived of the idea of the radio station while taking a mission field trip in New Guinea.

References

External links

WFCA website

Southern Gospel radio stations in the United States
FCA
French Camp Academy